Boat, usually stylized as BOAT, is an American indie rock band from Seattle, Washington. Their album Dress Like Your Idols was released in 2011 on Magic Marker Records and has received favorable reviews and notable press from major media outlets including Pitchfork Media, and AllMusic.  

The band's sound has been compared to Built to Spill, The New Pornographers, and Superchunk. BOAT's sixth studio album, Tread Lightly, was released on May 1, 2020 by Magic Marker Records. 

On March 19, 2020, D. Crane of BOAT began performing nightly on Instagram Live in response to the "Stay Home, Stay Health" order in Washington State. BOAT Song of the Night continued each weekday night through June 1st, a run of 53 shows.  The show features music from members of BOAT, fellow musicians such as Chris Ballew and Bob Nastanovich, author Lindy West and DJ Marco Collins. BSOTN resumed July 17, 2020 and continues sporadically.

On August 7, 2020, BOAT released the first singles from their quarantine collection, "Quartanteen Dreem."  The band released singles on each Bandcamp Friday that followed throughout 2020 with proceeds going to charities chosen by guest artists and collaborators.

Discography

Studio albums
Life Is A Shipwreck, We Must Remember To Sing In The Lifeboats (2004)
After All (2004)
Songs That You Might Not Like (2006)
Let's Drag Our Feet (2007)
Setting the Paces (2009)
Dress Like Your Idols (2011)
Pretend To Be Brave (2013)
50 Sweaty BOAT Fans Can't Be Wrong (Early Recordings Compilation) (2014)
Tread Lightly (2020)
No Plans To Stick The Landing (2022)

EPs
Topps 7" (2008) 
(I'll Beat My Chest Like) King Kong" (2011)

Singles
In a Pickle b/w May the Best Days Lie Ahead (2020)
Warm Up the Choppers b/w Dog Days (2020)
We Don't Need Enemies b/w Bundle the Ones (2020)
Fight The Clouds b/w There an Island (2020)
Drive to Oregon b/w Heartache Honey (2020)
My Haunted Friend b/w That's Not a Mountain, This is a Mountain (2021)

Personnel

Present
 D. Crane, vocals and guitar
 M. McKenzie, bass and guitar
 J. Goodman, drums, guitar, keys
 J. Long, drums.
 J. Askew, keys

Past or touring members
 Z. Duffy, guitar, keys (touring member)
 I. Bone, guitar (touring member)
 P. Mayben, drums
 J. Fell, drums (touring member)
 R. Cancro, guitar, saxophone, keys (touring member)
 B. Stewart, guitar, keys (touring member)
 J. Angle, drums

References

Indie rock musical groups from Washington (state)
Musical groups from Seattle